The following is a list of notable events and releases happened in: 2016, music, Ireland.

Events
Allie Sherlock starts performing. 

 
2016 in music